Kulageh (also Romanized as Kūlāgeh) is a village in Zagheh Rural District, Zagheh District, Khorramabad County, Lorestan Province, Iran. At the 2006 census, its population was 44, in 10 families.

References 

Towns and villages in Khorramabad County